Comfort is the debut album by the American alternative rock band Failure. Originally released in 1992, a version newly-remixed by Ken Andrews was released in 2020 as part of a box set containing Failure's first three albums.

Critical reception

Billboard wrote that "slow and medium-tempo songs mate drones to screeching guitar work that could make it with grunge-loving modern rockers." Trouser Press gave the album a mixed review, writing that "like most premature debuts, Comfort captures Failure, a young trio, learning how to make cool sounds together without benefit of worthwhile songs or an established personality."

The Chicago Tribune noted that "even when the guitars are turned up to 11, production and arrangements on Comfort have a rather polite surgical precision and clarity." The Orlando Sentinel called Failure "an engrossing three-piece variant on the melody-meets-mayhem theme."

Track listing
All tracks written by Ken Andrews.

"Submission" – 3:23
"Macaque" – 4:59
"Something" – 2:53
"Screen Man" – 6:15
"Swallow" – 2:31
"Muffled Snaps" – 3:55
"Kindred" – 2:21
"Pro-Catastrophe" – 3:09
"Princess" – 1:21
"Salt Wound" – 6:34

Personnel
Ken Andrews – vocals, guitar
Greg Edwards – bass
Robert Gauss - drums

References

Failure (band) albums
1992 albums
Albums produced by Steve Albini
Slash Records albums